is a Japanese biathlete. She represented Japan at the Biathlon World Championships 2015 in Kontiolahti.

References

External links 
 

1989 births
Living people
Japanese female biathletes
Place of birth missing (living people)